The Tolucan Times is a community weekly newspaper based in the Toluca Lake area of Los Angeles, California.  Founded in 1937, it is one of the oldest newspapers in the San Fernando Valley.  It covers politics and local news, as well as books, films, theatre and art reviews for the Los Angeles region.  It has a readership in the Los Angeles entertainment industry, as the newspaper is carried on all of the studio lots and is featured in various production businesses.  Better Business Bureau believes it to be out of business.

References

External links

Newspapers published in Greater Los Angeles
Alternative weekly newspapers published in the United States
Toluca Lake, Los Angeles
Weekly newspapers published in California